Allocasuarina fraseriana, commonly known as western sheoak, common sheoak, WA sheoak. Fraser's sheoak or just sheoak, is a tree in the family Casuarinaceae.  Endemic to Western Australia, it occurs near the coast in the south west corner of the State, from Jurien (30° S) to Albany (35° S).
The Noongar peoples know the tree as kondil.condil, kulli or gulli.

Description
Where exposed to salty coastal breezes, however, it is usually somewhat smaller. As with other Allocasuarina species, its "foliage" consists of slender green branchlets informally referred to as "needles" but more correctly termed cladodes. The cladodes are segmented, and the true leaves are tiny teeth encircling each joint. Male trees have small brown flower spikes at the end of branchlets. Flowering is prolific, giving male trees a rusty brown hue during flowering in late winter and early spring. Female trees bear small flowers on short branchlets of their own. Fertilised flowers develop egg-shaped cones from 1½ to 3½ centimetres in diameter.

Distribution
The tree has a distribution from with the bulk of the population being found in the South West hinterland to the Great Southern regions of Western Australia with smaller populations being found between Jurien and Moora. It grows in lateritic soils in the understorey of Eucalyptus marginata forest on the Darling Range and in areas near the coast it is found in sandy soils in woodland and open forest.

History
Western Sheoak was first collected in 1840 by Johann Preiss.  The specific name fraseriana honours the botanist Charles Fraser. The species was first formally described as Casuarina fraseriana by Friedrich Anton Wilhelm Miquel in 1848, Revisio critica Casuarinarum and later revised into the Allocasuarina genera by Lawrence Alexander Sidney Johnson in 1982 in the work Notes on Casuarinaceae II in the Journal of the Adelaide Botanic Gardens.

Uses
Noongar women give birth beneath the tree because of the soft needles. The needles were also used for bedding in shelters and often covered with a kangaroo skin cloak to make a bed. The wood was used to make boomerangs.
Early settlers of Western Australia used sheoak timber for roof shingles.  Later it was used in the construction of kegs and casks.  Today, the timber is prized for its broad medullary rays, and is often used for wood-turning and carving of decorative ornaments. The sapwood is a pale yellow colour and the heartwood is dark-red to brown. The texture is moderately fine and even. Green wood has a density is about 1000 kg/m2, the density of air-dried wood is about 730 kg/m3.

The seed of the plant is favoured by red-eared firetails (Stagonopleura oculata), an endemic grass finch.

References

External links
 
 
 

fraseriana
Trees of Australia
Trees of Mediterranean climate
Rosids of Western Australia
Fagales of Australia
Plants described in 1848